Odolf Larsen (23 November 1897 – 2 July 1973) was a Norwegian middle-distance runner. He competed in the men's 800 metres at the 1920 Summer Olympics.

References

1897 births
1973 deaths
Athletes (track and field) at the 1920 Summer Olympics
Norwegian male middle-distance runners
Olympic athletes of Norway
Place of birth missing